Picross e is a series of nonogram puzzle video games developed and published by Jupiter for the Nintendo 3DS handheld game console. It is the successor to Jupiter's Nintendo-published Picross games including the Mario's Picross series and Picross DS.

Games

Spin-offs

Jupiter used the mechanics and UI of their Picross e games as the basis for a number of licensed spin-off games:

Reception

Reception towards the series from professional critics has been "average" according to aggregate review website Metacritic and GameRankings.

See also
Mario's Picross, a Picross game made by Nintendo and Jupiter.
Picross DS, the predecessor to the Picross e series for the Nintendo DS.
Picross 3D: Round 2, a spinoff, 3D version of Picross for the Nintendo 3DS.
Picross S, the successor to the Picross e series for the Nintendo Switch.
Nonogram

References

External links
 Picross e official website
 Picross e2 official website
 Picross e3 official website
 Picross e4 official website
 Picross e5 official website
 Picross e6 official website
 Picross e7 official website
 Picross e8 official website

2011 video games
Jupiter (company) games
Nintendo 3DS games
Nintendo 3DS-only games
Nonograms
Video game franchises introduced in 2011
Video games developed in Japan
Picross (video game series)